Silvia Morel (born 18 March 1977) is a Chilean table tennis player. She competed in the women's doubles event at the 2000 Summer Olympics.

References

1977 births
Living people
Chilean female table tennis players
Olympic table tennis players of Chile
Table tennis players at the 2000 Summer Olympics
Place of birth missing (living people)
Pan American Games medalists in table tennis
Pan American Games bronze medalists for Chile
Table tennis players at the 1999 Pan American Games
Medalists at the 1999 Pan American Games
21st-century Chilean women